Saint Stephen is a panel painting by Giotto, dating to around 1330–1335. It is painted in tempera on gold ground. It is in the collection of and serves as the logo of the Museo Horne in Florence.

Bibliography
 
 

1330s paintings
Paintings by Giotto
Paintings in the collection of the Museo Horne
Giotto